SuperOffice is a European supplier of business-to-business customer relationship management (CRM) software. SuperOffice was founded in 1989 by Une Amundsen. He renamed the company "Superland" and refers to himself as "The King of Superland".

SuperOffice delivers its products through subsidiaries, distributors and resellers in Norway, Sweden, Finland, Denmark, Germany, the United Kingdom, the Benelux countries, Austria, Switzerland and the United States. SuperOffice also delivers consulting services related to strategic CRM issues, implementation, integration and user education.

SuperOffice AS was listed on the Oslo Stock Exchange from 1997 to 2009 under the ticker "SUO".

The company claims that more than 6,000 European companies are using SuperOffice CRM products.

SuperOffice has both an on-premises version which runs on Windows and Web platforms, as well as a software-as-a-service solution called "SuperOffice CRM Online". Mobile apps for iPhone and Android are available.

Acquisitions
On 14 April 2020, SuperOffice announced its acquisition by Danish investment firm Axcel.

On 14 September 2020, SuperOffice acquired the Dutch software company Infobridge.

Design Awards
SuperOffice CRM 5 was recognized with the Norwegian Design Council's Award for Design Excellence in 2002.

References

Software companies of Norway
Customer relationship management software companies
Software companies established in 1989
2020 mergers and acquisitions
Norwegian companies established in 1989